Leopoldo Centeno (born 27 April 1967) is a Spanish modern pentathlete. He competed at the 1988 and 1992 Summer Olympics.

References

External links
 

1967 births
Living people
Spanish male modern pentathletes
Olympic modern pentathletes of Spain
Modern pentathletes at the 1988 Summer Olympics
Modern pentathletes at the 1992 Summer Olympics
Sportspeople from Lugo